Pleasure Island Family Theme Park was a theme park in Cleethorpes, North East Lincolnshire, England. It was commonly known as Pleasure Island.  The park opened on 27 May 1993. It was originally a subsidiary of Flamingo Land Ltd. Pleasure Island became independent of Flamingo Land in May 2010 and was owned and operated by DewarSavile Enterprises Ltd until closing at the end of the 2016 season.

History 
Pleasure Island Family Theme Park stood on the site of the former Cleethorpes Marineland and Zoo. Owned and operated as a satellite zoo of Flamingo Park, and later by Scotia Leisure, the zoo had such attractions as dolphins, sea lions and pelicans. The zoo closed in 1977. The site was sold to Pleasureworld, a division of RKF Entertainment, who announced that a new theme park would be built, as a sister park to the Pleasurewood Hills park near Lowestoft and bearing the same name. Construction began on the new theme park in the 1980s.

RKF Entertainment went into receivership during the early 1990s and construction of the park was halted. The site was sold to Robert Gibb, the managing director of Flamingo Land in Malton, North Yorkshire. Gibb decided to continue with the redevelopment of the site as a theme park, which became Pleasure Island. Reconstruction of the park was completed by Gibb in 1992 and Pleasure Island Family Theme Park was opened on 27 May 1993. Robert Gibb's son, Gordon Gibb, later became the chief executive of the company to directly run Flamingo Land, while his sister Vicky Gibb, and subsequently other sister Melanie Wood (formerly Gibb), took the responsibility for the management of Pleasure Island.

Negotiations took place to separate Pleasure Island from its sister park Flamingo Land, resulting in the managing director of Pleasure Island Melanie Wood taking control of the park on 14 April 2010 as a separate entity from the family company. Pleasure Island was then operated by Dewarsavile Enterprises Ltd, directed by Wood, and marked the end of Pleasure Island and Flamingo Land's association. As a result of the ownership transfer the Grimsby Telegraph website broke news that the park had closed. The park reopened under its new ownership on 1 May 2010. In 2013 a farm and petting zoo was added, including a tractor ride replacing an electric monorail.

Pleasure Island Family Theme Park closed permanently at the end of the 2016 season. The contents, including a 1904 carousel, were put up for auction. The last of the items were sold off in October 2018.

Areas 
The theme park was split into 6 areas:
 Africa – themed around Africa, the largest area of Pleasure island and containing one white-knuckle ride
 Kiddies Kingdom – rides for especially young children
 Morocco – themed around Morocco, with three white-knuckle rides: the Alakazam, Hydromax and the Hyper Blaster
 Old England – themed around England, it contained the park entrance and was the smallest area of Pleasure Island
 Spain – themed around Spain and nearly as small as Old England, containing one ride and other attractions
 White Knuckle Valley – three white-knuckle rides: the Boomerang (a Vekoma Boomerang roller coaster), the Pendulus and the Terror Rack

Height restrictions 
The minimum heights are colour-coded as follows:

* Although , like green an adult was required on the ride with someone.
** Children below the age of 7 years, except where noted.

Rides

Roller coasters

Thrill rides

Family rides

Kiddie rides

Water rides

Former rides 
 Condor – a HUSS Condor Stood on the site of Kiddies Cove, before being sold at auction
 1001 Nights – replaced by The Galleon
 Dream Boat – stood where the Hydro Max is now
 Big Splash – a unique water ride replaced by The Falls of Fear
 Crazy Loop – a Pinfari Looping Roller Coaster that also previously operated at Flamingo Land under the same name. It is now located in Brean Leisure Park as 'Shockwave'
 4 Man Bob – a small Schwarzkopf Bobsleigh Roller Coaster which was replaced by 'Crazy Loop'
 Pony Rodeo – a small, monorail-like rollercoaster themed around riding a horse
 Para Tower - originally from Drayton Manor Theme Park, was a tall structure that would take riders up for an overhead view of the park. Was scheduled for removal but was only removed after the park sold it for scrap metal.

Shows 
 Masai Warriors Show – introduced during ownership by Flamingo Land as a copy of their 'Bongo Warriors Show'  (Africa)
 Bird Show – parrots, barn owls and red-legged seriema performing tricks (Spain)
 Sea Lion Show – sea lions performing tricks (Morocco)
 Tommy Tinkaboo Musical Extravaganza (Morocco)
 The Basil Brush Laughter Show (Africa)
 High School Summer – set as the movie High School Musical 1 + 2 (Morocco)
 Rock-afire Explosion - Animatronic show featuring Billy Bob and his singing animal band (Morocco)

Restaurants and eateries 
 Food Court (Spain)
 McCormack's Family Bar – a family-themed restaurant and bar selling traditional British pub meals (Old England)
 Lakeside – drinks and snack sales
 Tommy's Kiosk and Cafe – drinks and snack sales
 Fatimas Fish & Chips – fish and chip shop.
 Sinbads Ice Cream Parlour – iced cream and drinks sales
 Carousel – snack bar in the Carousel building.

Shops 
 Tinkaboo Sweet Shop (Spain)
 Gift Shop  (Old England)
 Shrieksville Shop of Horrors (Africa)

Others 
 Ali Baba's Arcade – arcade with toilets next to the Gravitron and Spain area (Morocco)
 Kiddies' Cove – children's play area with swings and benches, next to the Sealion Show and Century 2000

References

External links 

 Pleasure Island official website (archived)
 Pleasure Island at Theme Park Junkies
 Pleasure Island at ARDcoasters.com
 Pleasure Island at ThemeParks-UK
 Yorbex web forum on Facebook

1993 establishments in England
2016 disestablishments in England
Amusement parks closed in 2016
Amusement parks in England
Amusement parks opened in 1993
Buildings and structures demolished in 2018
Cleethorpes
Defunct amusement parks in the United Kingdom
Defunct amusement parks in England
Tourist attractions in Lincolnshire
 Modern ruins